is a former Japanese football player. She played for Japan national team.

Club career
Miyazaki was born in Iga on October 13, 1983. when she was a high school and Tenri University student, she played for her local club Iga FC Kunoichi from 1999 to 2005. she was selected Best Eleven in 2002. After graduating from Tenri University, she joined TEPCO Mareeze in 2006. She left the club in 2009. In 2013, she came back at Okayama Yunogo Belle.

National team career
On August 5, 2001, when Miyazaki was 17 years old, she debuted for Japan national team against China. In 2002, she was selected Japan U-20 national team for 2002 U-19 World Championship. She was also a member of Japan for 2003 World Cup. She played 18 games and scored 2 goals for Japan until 2009.

National team statistics

International goals

References

External links

1983 births
Living people
Tenri University alumni
Association football people from Mie Prefecture
Japanese women's footballers
Japan women's international footballers
Nadeshiko League players
Iga FC Kunoichi players
TEPCO Mareeze players
Okayama Yunogo Belle players
Asian Games bronze medalists for Japan
Asian Games medalists in football
Women's association football defenders
Footballers at the 2002 Asian Games
Medalists at the 2002 Asian Games
2003 FIFA Women's World Cup players